Come Here, Mukhtar! is a 1965 drama film directed by Semyon Tumanov.

Plot 
An East European Shepherd is found abandoned in a rail car, and nicknamed Mukhtar. Second Lieutenant Nikolay Glazychev who was caused to the station, release the dog and bring him to the nursery. Woman, who abandoned dog, was found, but she refuses dog and sells him to militsiya for 100 rubles. Mukhtar was assigned to Glazychev, who begins to "convert" his pet dog to service one. Mukhtar gradually gets used to his guide, though with some problems, he completed his studies.

Mukhtar's service begins. Dog predominantly engages in household cases. Crimes solved with the use of Mukhtar, though small, but in large quantities; as a result, the amount of theft, "returned" by Mukhtar, exceeds 3 million pre-reform Soviet rubles.

When the former owner with her husband, who was admiral, came to the police kennel to see the dog, he rushed at her. It had developed a conditioned reflex: "Only the guide has the right to call him by name".

In winter, Mukhtar is on the trail of a recidivist Frolov, who killed the kolkhoz farm guard, and the traces of the bandit are covered by a strong snowstorm. During detention recidivist, who armed with a pistol, hit Mukhtar by two bullets, but the dog from last forces clung to the throat of the criminal. Mukhtar survived, but unable to serve, and, despite all the efforts of Glazychev, the dog was discarded.

Glazychev walks the chain of command and, in the end, met militsiya Commissioner, who led the arrest of a repeat offender Frolov and remember the contribution of the Mukhtar in the operation. Finally official permission to leave the Mukhtar of merit at the nursery on state allowance was received.

Production
Mukhtar was modelled after the heroic dog Sultan. In ten years of police service Sultan took part in five thousand operations, detained more than a thousand criminals, and found stolen property worth three million rubles. After the death of the Sultan his body stuffed and exhibited at the Museum of Leningrad Criminal Investigation Department with a detailed description of the merits.  In 1959 the famous Soviet writer Izrail Metter visited the museum.

Being a great lover of dogs, Metter became interested in the fate of this  dog and decided to dedicate one of his works of literature.

So there was a psychological novel called  Mukhtar  (the author has changed the dog's name), published in 1960 magazine Novy Mir.  The story turned out to be quite successful, and the management of  Mosfilm  has started its film adaptation, with scriptwriting by Metter himself.

Cast
 Yuri Nikulin as Lieutenant Glazychev
 dog Dyke as Mukhtar
 Vladimir Yemelyanov as Sergey Prokofyevich, Colonel, head of nursery
 Leonid Kmit as Stepan Dugovets
 Yuri Belov as Larionov
 Alla Larionova as Masha, Mukhtar's former mistress  
 Fyodor Nikitin as veterinarian Zyryanov
 Nikolai Kryuchkov as police Commissioner
Sergey Golovanov as Admiral Kolesov
 Lev Durov as a thief-recidivist
 Ivan Ryzhov as captain
 Iya Marx as Fyodor's grandmother  
 Ekaterina Savinova as Vera
 Vladimir Gulyaev as militia captain
  Vadim Zakharchenko as investigator

References

External links

 О собаках в фильме «Ко мне, Мухтар!»

1965 films
Mosfilm films
Films about dogs
Soviet drama films
Fictional dogs
1965 drama films
Films based on Russian novels
Films adapted into television shows